The Tanami Desert is a desert in northern Australia, situated in the Northern Territory and Western Australia.

It has a rocky terrain with small hills, and cacti. The Tanami was the Northern Territory's final frontier and was not fully explored by Australians of European descent until well into the twentieth century. It is traversed by the Tanami Track.

The name Tanami is thought to be an anglicisation of the Warlpiri name for the area, "Chanamee", meaning "never die". This referred to certain rock holes in the desert which were said never to run dry.

Under the name Tanami, the desert is classified as an interim Australian bioregion, comprising .

Biological resources
According to government commissions, the Tanami desert is uniquely "one of the most important biological areas to be found in Australia particularly as it provides refuge for several of Australia's rare and endangered species".

The species that are found include:
 Western chestnut mouse (Pseudomys nanus)
 Little native mouse (Pseudomys delicatulus)
 Long-tailed planigale (Planigale ingrami)

Significant bird species include:
 Grey falcon (Falco hypoleucos)
 Australian painted snipe (Rostratulas)
 Freckled duck (Stictonetta naevosa)

Mineral resources
There are several mines in the Tanami Desert including:
The Granites gold mine
Coyote Gold Mine

Local indigenous groups
The Tanami Desert is part of Kukatja and Warlpiri country. The Tjurabalan live at the edge of the desert.

There are a large number of cultural sites in the Tanami.

Southern Tanami Indigenous Protected Area
In July 2012,  of the desert area (38% of the total bioregion) was declared an indigenous protected area or conservation zone.

See also

 Deserts of Australia
 List of deserts by area

Notes

References
 Kelly, Kieran, (2003)  Tanami : on foot across Australia's desert heart Sydney : Pan Macmillan Australia, 2003. 
 Thackway, R and I D Cresswell (1995) An interim biogeographic regionalisation for Australia : a framework for setting priorities in the National Reserves System Cooperative Program Version 4.0 Canberra : Australian Nature Conservation Agency, Reserve Systems Unit, 1995.

External links
 Australian government paper on environmental conditions

 
Biogeography of Western Australia
Deserts of Western Australia
IBRA subregions
Deserts of the Northern Territory